Tharun Bhascker Dhaassyam (born 5 November 1988) is an Indian film director, writer, actor, and television presenter who works in Telugu cinema. He directed the critically acclaimed romantic comedy film Pelli Choopulu (2016), which won him the National Film Award for Best Feature Film in Telugu and Best Screenplay – Dialogues. He later directed Ee Nagaraniki Emaindhi (2018), and made his debut in a lead role with Meeku Maathrame Cheptha (2019).

Early life
Tharun Bhascker was born on 5 November 1988 in Madras and was raised in Hyderabad. His father hailed from Warangal, Telangana, while his mother is from Tirupati, Andhra Pradesh. Bhasckar studied at Hyderabad Public School, and Swami Vivekananda Institute of Technology. He later graduated from New York Film Academy.

His father, Uday Bhaskar, died in 2015. His mother, Geetha Bhaskar, made her acting debut in Sekhar Kammula's Fidaa (2017).

Film career
Bhascker started his career with short films such as Anukokunda, and Sainma. Anukokunda was screen at the Cannes Film Festival.

His first full length feature film was Pelli Choopulu (2016). The film received National Film Award for Best Feature Film in Telugu, and Bhasckar won Best Screenplay for Dialogues. The film was remade in Hindi as Mitron (2018), in Malayalam as Vijay Superum Pournamiyum (2019), and in Tamil as Oh Manapenne.

In 2018, Bhasckar played the role of Singeetham Srinivasa Rao in the biopic, Mahanati. His second directorial is the buddy comedy film Ee Nagaraniki Emaindhi (2018). Later in the year, he wrote the screenplay for the Zee5 web series, B. Tech.

In 2019, Bhaskar made his debut in a lead role with Meeku Maathrame Cheptha.

Personal life
Bhasckar is married to Latha Naidu. She is a production and costume designer for films and advertisements. She worked for films such as Pelli Choopulu, Ee Nagaraniki Emaindi and U Turn.

Filmography

Feature films

Short films

Television

Web series

Discography

Awards and nominations

References

External links
 
 

1988 births
Living people
Telugu film directors
Film directors from Hyderabad, India
21st-century Indian film directors
People from Warangal
Screenwriters from Hyderabad, India
Telugu screenwriters
Best Dialogue National Film Award winners
South Indian International Movie Awards winners
Santosham Film Awards winners
Indian screenwriters
Indian male screenwriters
Indian film directors
Telugu playback singers
Male actors in Telugu cinema